Farrah Karapetian (born 1978) is an American visual artist. She works primarily in cameraless photography, incorporating multiple mediums in her process including sculpture, theatre, drawing, creative nonfiction, and social practice. She is especially known for her work that "marries two traditions in photography — that of the staged picture and of the image made without a camera." Recurrent concerns include the agency of the individual versus that of authority and the role of the body in determining that agency.

Biography
Farrah Karapetian was born in Marin, California to Hamidatun and Aswan Karapetian, and grew up in Highland Park in northeast Los Angeles. Her father was a graphic designer and drummer, and her mother has degrees in culinary anthropology and bicultural education; together her parents founded WizdomInc, a publishing company dedicated to providing equal access to topical subjects in education and professions to English-language learners. Her parents were active members of SUBUD

Karapetian earned a Bachelor of Arts from Yale University in 2000. She majored in fine art with a concentration in photography. She earned a Master of Fine Arts from the University of California at Los Angeles in 2008; her thesis committee consisted of James Welling, Charles Ray, Lari Pittman, and Mary Kelly, reflecting her interest in experimental photography, space and scale, the politics of imagery, and the phenomenology of visual experience, respectively.

Karapetian leads the photography program at the University of San Diego and has taught visual arts at multiple universities, including courses at Otis College of Art and Design that underscored her interest in the history of the photography of unrest and in the history and practice of the house in and as contemporary art. She is a frequent speaker and panelist, including especially on topics such as Philosophy and Photography at the Los Angeles County Museum of Art  and on various topics relating to the politics of visual space in a recurring relationship with the Wende Museum.

Karapetian's writing on the politics of visual culture has been published by the Los Angeles Review of Books, and in English and Norwegian on Seismopolite. Her research and writing on the house in and as contemporary art was funded by a Andy Warhol Foundation Arts Writers Grant in 2013. Her writing on photography has been published by The Brooklyn Rail, Whitehot Magazine, Artslant, and Nonsite. She was part of Archivo Platform's Research Network in 2021.

Work
Karapetian's cameraless photography is understood as experimental in the lineage of Henry Holmes Smith and Robert Heinecken, but discussed alongside artists such as Matthew Brandt and Chris McCaw as being part of a generation of artists "rematerializing photography." The consequence of this work is to unpack the changing mental and physical landscape of a digital era. "More like a metaphor than a record, Karapetian's work in photography "generates for viewers enough interference to disrupt and call attention to our era's deeply entrenched response of permitting the constant newsfeed of documentary to slide by us as political ephemera."

Karapetian's cameraless photographic explorations of her own family's trajectory of migration were funded by the Pollock-Krasner Foundation in 2017. Her research on Vsevolod Meyerhold through the Fulbright Program in St. Petersburg, Russia in 2018 emphasized the body as the arbiter of authenticity in revolutionary creative practice. This project isolated the performative nature of her work with populations playing active parts in their own representation. It also served as a starting point for her research into the relevance of the creative output of the Interwar period for the present day. Her work on a largely female network from that period began in 2021 with a grant from the City of Los Angeles. The recovery project focuses on knowledge production in both visual and verbal forms, including publication of a portfolio by artist Ida Kar. 

In 2022, she worked with multiple generations of residents of Tashkent to unpack their memories while picking cotton for the state. In 2019, she worked with the transgender community in Los Angeles to recreate a defunct bar for a project called "Collective Memory" at the Von Lintel Gallery; in 2014, she was the lead artist on a project with the Angels Gate Cultural Center in San Pedro, California called “Service and Other Stories,” in which veterans of the U.S. Armed Forces culled from their own memories.  In 2012, she worked with students at East Los Angeles College to mine their and their families' experiences of protest in Southern California, leading a program called “Directed Studies: Los Angeles Times.” Also in 2012, she worked with residents of Flint, Michigan to represent their own and their city's growth as part of the Flint Public Art Project. In her studio work, her writing and speaking, and her public projects, "Karapetian explicitly recodes photography, turning an act of reproduction into one of production"

Selected collections
Karapetian's artwork is held in permanent collections that include, J. Paul Getty Museum, Los Angeles, CA; Wende Museum of the Cold War, Culver City, CA; Los Angeles County Museum of Art, Los Angeles, CA; San Francisco Museum of Modern Art, San Francisco, CA;

References

External links
 

American women photographers
American people of Armenian descent
People from Marin County, California
University of California, Los Angeles alumni
Yale University alumni
1978 births
Living people
21st-century American women